The President of the National Assembly is the presiding officer of the lower chamber of the legislature.

Presidents of the National Assembly (1946–70)
Presidents of the National Assembly of Cambodia from 1946 to 1970.

Presidents of the National Assembly (1970–75)
Presidents of the National Assembly of the Khmer Republic from 1970 to 1975.

Presidents of the People's Representative Assembly (1976–79)
Presidents of the People's Representative Assembly of Democratic Kampuchea from 1976 to 1979.

Presidents of the National Assembly (1981–93)
Presidents of the National Assembly of the People's Republic of Kampuchea (1981-1989) and the State of Cambodia (1989-1993).

Presidents of the National Assembly (1993–present)

Presidents

Vice presidents

References

Sources
Various editions of The Europa World Year Book

National Assembly, Presidents
Cambodia, National Assembly
1946 establishments in Cambodia
Presidents of the National Assembly (Cambodia)